Ignacio Andrés Cacheiro (born 12 March 1993) is an Argentine professional footballer who plays as a forward for Italian club ASD Ilvamaddalena 1903.

Career
Cacheiro had a stint with River Plate de Junín before joining Sarmiento. Having made his professional debut in a Primera B Nacional fixture with Unión Santa Fe on 17 February, Cacheiro scored his first senior goal on 24 March during a victory at home to Independiente. He appeared fifty-nine times and scored twice for Sarmiento in Primera B Nacional and in the Argentine Primera División; after the club won promotion in 2014. In August 2016, Cacheiro was loaned to tier two's Guillermo Brown. He returned to Sarmiento for the 2017–18 campaign, in which he netted eight goals in; including a brace over Atlético de Rafaela.

June 2018 saw Cacheiro move to Ecuadorian football with Aucas. He made twenty-two total appearances as they qualified for 2019 Copa Sudamericana, whilst also scoring a sole goal against Macará on 17 August. In January 2019, Cacheiro returned to his homeland with Primera División's Patronato. Fifteen appearances followed. In September 2020, Cacheiro headed to Europe with Romanian Liga II side FC U Craiova.

In September 2021, Cacheiro moved to Italian Eccellenza club ASD Ilvamaddalena 1903. In his first season in Ilvamaddalena, the club was promoted to Serie D for the upcoming 2022-23 season.

Career statistics
.

Honours
FC U Craiova 1948
Liga II: 2020–21

References

External links

1993 births
Living people
People from Junín, Buenos Aires
Argentine footballers
Association football forwards
Argentine expatriate footballers
Expatriate footballers in Ecuador
Expatriate footballers in Romania
Expatriate footballers in Italy
Argentine expatriate sportspeople in Ecuador
Argentine expatriate sportspeople in Romania
Argentine expatriate sportspeople in Italy
Primera Nacional players
Argentine Primera División players
Ecuadorian Serie A players
Liga II players
Eccellenza players
Club Atlético Sarmiento footballers
Guillermo Brown footballers
S.D. Aucas footballers
Club Atlético Patronato footballers
Chacarita Juniors footballers
FC U Craiova 1948 players
Sportspeople from Buenos Aires Province